Sandor Ellix Katz (born May 20, 1962) is an American food writer and DIY food activist.

Work
A self-described "fermentation fetishist", Katz has taught hundreds of food workshops around the United States, and his book Wild Fermentation (2003) has been called a classic, "the bible for people embarking on DIY projects like sourdough or sauerkraut", and "especially notorious for getting people excited about fermenting food". He was named one of Chow magazine's top "provocateurs, trendsetters, and rabble-rousers" in 2009.

Personal life
Born to an Ashkenazi Jewish family with origins in Eastern Europe, Katz grew up in New York City on the Upper West Side. His grandparents immigrated from Belarus in 1920, then part of the Soviet Union. He is openly gay, an AIDS survivor, and began his fermentation experimentation while living in a rural, off-the-grid Radical Faerie community in Tennessee.

Popular culture
Katz was the subject of the 2009 punk rock song "Human(e) Meat (The Flensing of Sandor Katz)",  a satirical vegan response to Katz's 2006 chapter on "Vegetarian Ethics and Humane Meat" in The Revolution Will Not Be Microwaved.

Bibliography

References

External links
 https://www.youtube.com/watch?v=M1L46xWCWCo
 wildfermentation.com, Sandor Katz's official site
 Sandorkraut, a portrait of Sandor Katz (2014, 12 min)
 
 Zeichner, Walter. Fermented Foods Carry Culture and Health (archived 2014). Out in the Mountains.

1962 births
Living people
Jewish American writers
American Ashkenazi Jews
American people of Belarusian-Jewish descent
LGBT Jews
American gay writers
Radical Faeries members
American food writers
20th-century American non-fiction writers
21st-century American non-fiction writers
20th-century American male writers
James Beard Foundation Award winners
American male non-fiction writers
People with HIV/AIDS
21st-century American male writers
21st-century American Jews
Food activists